Led Zeppelin's 1968 tour of Scandinavia was a concert tour of Denmark, Sweden, and Norway by the English rock band.  The tour commenced on 7 September and concluded on 24 September 1968. It was Led Zeppelin's first concert tour. However, the band was billed under the name "The Yardbirds" at the time.

Overview
Led Zeppelin's debut tour was an outstanding contractual commitment left over from The Yardbirds. The band's first concert at Teen Club, a school gymnasium in Gladsaxe, Denmark, was performed exactly two months to the day after The Yardbirds' final concert. The band's manager, Peter Grant, later said of this first concert: "Standing by the side of the stage, it was obvious that there was special chemistry."

Guitarist Jimmy Page recalled that "the tour went fantastically for us, we left them stomping the floors after every show." According to  singer Robert Plant:

Plant also recalled the following:

For these early shows, the band was billed as the "Yardbirds" or "New Yardbirds", despite the fact that Jimmy Page was now the only surviving link with the previous band. Page later said:

Tour dates

Setlist
The setlists of the earliest shows are sketchy, as no recordings of these shows exist.

A likely setlist for this tour consisted of:
 "Train Kept A-Rollin'"
 "I Can't Quit You Baby"
 "Dazed and Confused"
 "How Many More Times"
 "White Summer"
 "For Your Love"
 "You Shook Me"
 "Babe I'm Gonna Leave You"
 "As Long As I Have You"
 "Communication Breakdown"

References

Sources
Lewis, Dave and Pallett, Simon (1997) Led Zeppelin: The Concert File, London: Omnibus Press. .

External links
Comprehensive archive of known concert appearances by Led Zeppelin (official website)
Led Zeppelin concert setlists
Led Zeppelin's first concert ever - 7 September 1968 at Gladsaxe Teen Club
View in Google Earth

Led Zeppelin concert tours
1968 concert tours
1968 in Denmark
1968 in Sweden